Özgön or Uzgen is a district of Osh Region in south-western Kyrgyzstan.

Demographics
As of 2009, Özgön District included 1 town, and 19 villages. Its population, according to the Population and Housing Census of 2009, was 228,114. Of them, 49,410 people live in urban areas, and 178,704 in rural ones.

Ethnic composition
According to the 2009 Census, the ethnic composition of the Özgön District (de jure population) was:

Towns, rural communities and villages

In total, Özgön District include 1 town and 99 settlements in 19 rural communities. Each rural community can consist of one or several villages. The rural communities and settlements in the Özgön District are:

 town Özgön
 Ak-Jar (seat: Ak-Jar; incl. Kakyr, Semiz-Köl and Bolshevik)
 Altyn-Bulak (seat: Altyn-Bulak; incl. Chechebay, Tash-Bashat, Sasyk-Bulak, Kara-Batkak and Kandava)
 Bash-Döbö (seat: Kengesh; incl. Jangy-Jol, Kosh-Korgon, Kyzyl-Kyrman and Kashka-Terek)
 Changget (seat: Changget; incl. Östürüü)
 Deng-Bulak (seat: Bakmal; incl. Babash-Uulu, Böksö-Jol, Jangy-Abat, Deng-Bulak, Kara-Daryya, Michurin, Özgörüsh, Töölös and Chymbay)
 Iyri-Suu (seat: Jiyde; incl. Ak-Terek, Janggakty, Kara-Kolot, Kors-Etti, Kyrgyzstan and Orkazgan)
 Jalpak-Tash (seat: Kurbu-Tash; incl. Ak-Terek, Karl Marks, Kirov, Kysyk-Alma, Tuz-Bel, Üch-Kaptal and Kara-Taryk)
 Jazy (seat: Kara-Dyykan; incl. Kyzyl-Dyykan, Jeerenchi and Jazy)
 Jylandy (seat: Jylandy; incl. Kalta, Krasny Mayak, Progress, Yassy and Botomoynok)
 Kara-Tash (seat: Iyrek; incl. Korgon, Üngkür, Yntymak and Elchibek)
 Karool (seat: Karool; incl. Jan-Shoro, Myrza-Aryk, Orto-Aryk and Sheraly)
 Köldük (seat: Shamal-Terek; incl. Chalk-Öydö)
 Kurshab (seat: Kurshab; incl. Erdik and Shagym)
 Kyzyl-Oktyabr (seat: Staraya Pokrovka; incl. Alga, Besh-Abyshka, Guzar, Kochkor-Ata, Kreml, Kurshab, Kyzyl-Oktyabr, Kyzyl-Senggir and Yntymak)
 Kyzyl-Too (seat: Kyzyl-Too; incl. Donguz-Too, Ak-Kyya, Karchabek and Erkin-Too)
 Myrza-Ake (seat: Myrza-Ake; incl. Adyr and Babyr)
 Salam-Alik (7: center - village: Salam-Alik; and also villages Ak-Terek, Ara-Köl, Kosh-Eter, Kyzyl-Bayrak, Kyzyl-Charba and 15 Jash)
 Tört-Köl (seat: Shoro-Bashat; incl. villages Ana-Kyzyl, Boston, Kyymyl and Makarenko)
 Zerger (seat: Tosoy; incl. Ayuu, Jangy-Ayyl, Zerger, Kayrat, Kuturgan, Nichke-Say and Toktogul)

References 

Districts of Osh Region